David M. Knezek Jr. (born August 13, 1986) is an American politician who represents the 8th district on the Wayne County Commission. He is a member of the Democratic Party. Prior to his appointment to the Wayne County Commission in 2020, he served as a member of the Michigan Senate from 2015 to 2018 and as a member of the Michigan House of Representatives from 2013 to 2014.

Education and early career 
Knezek has a bachelor's degree in political science from the University of Michigan-Dearborn.  He then served in the U.S. military as a scout sniper platoon member in the United States Marine Corps, completing two tours of duty in Iraq. He was honorably discharged in 2014, having risen to the rank of sergeant.

References

External links
 
 Legislative website 
 Twitter account

1986 births
21st-century American politicians
Living people
Democratic Party members of the Michigan House of Representatives
Democratic Party Michigan state senators
Military personnel from Michigan
People from Dearborn Heights, Michigan
United States Marine Corps personnel of the Iraq War
United States Marines
University of Michigan–Dearborn alumni